Rafael González Córdova (born 24 April 1950) is a Chilean football midfielder who played for Chile in the 1974 FIFA World Cup. He also played for Colo-Colo.

References

External links
FIFA profile

1950 births
Chilean footballers
Chile international footballers
Association football midfielders
Colo-Colo footballers
1974 FIFA World Cup players
1975 Copa América players
Living people